The Uprising of Georgi Voyteh (– Slav Uprising in Pomoravlje) was a Bulgarian uprising in the Byzantine theme of Bulgaria in 1072. It was the second major attempt to restore the Bulgarian Empire after the Uprising of Peter Delyan in 1040-1041. 

The main prerequisites for the uprising were the weakness of Byzantium after the invasions of the Pechenegs in the lower Danube, the great defeat at the hands of the Seljuk Turks in the battle of Manzikert (1071) and the invasion of the Normans from southern Italy as well as the rising taxes during the reign of Michael VII. The uprising was prepared by the Bulgarian nobility in Skopje led by Georgi Voyteh. They chose the son of Serbian Prince of Duklja Michael, Constantine Bodin as their leader, as he was a descendant of the Bulgarian Emperor Samuil. In the autumn of 1072 Constantine Bodin arrived at Prizren where he was proclaimed Emperor of the Bulgarians under the name Peter III. The Serbian Prince sent 300 soldiers led by Vojvoda Petrilo.

An army under Damianos Dalassenos was immediately sent from Constantinople to help the strategos of the Theme of Bulgaria, Nikephoros Karantenos. In the battle that followed the Byzantine army was completely defeated. Dalassenos and other Byzantine commanders were captured and Skopie was taken by the Bulgarians troops.

After that success the rebels tried to expand the area under their control. Constantine Bodin headed north and reached Naissus (modern Niš). Because some Bulgarian towns with Byzantine garrisons did not surrender, they were burned down. Petrilo marched southwards and captured Ochrid (modern Ohrid) and Devol. However, near the town of Kastoria his large army was defeated by the Byzantines and some Bulgarian commanders who did not want to acknowledge Peter III as their ruler.

Another army was sent from Constantinople under Michael Saronites. Saronites seized Skoupoi and in December 1072 he defeated the army of Constantine Bodin at a place known as Taonios (in the southern parts of Kosovo Polje). Constantine Bodin and Georgi Voyteh were captured. The army which Prince Michael sent to relieve his son did not achieve anything because its commander, a Norman mercenary defected to the Byzantines. The rebellion was finally crushed in 1073 by doux Nikephoros Bryennios.

Sources 

 Златарски, В. История на българската държава през средните векове, том II: България под византийско владичество, Издателство „Наука и изкуство“, София 1972 (цитирано по електронното издание в Книги за Македония, 10.8.2008)
 Павлов, Пл. Бунтари и авантюристи в Средновековна България, Издателство „Абагар“, Велико Търново 2000,  (глава Георги Войтех от "рода на кавканите" в електронното издание LiterNet, 2005)
 Литаврин, Г. Болгария и Византия в XI-XII вв., Издательство Академии наук СССР, Москва 1960
 Dennis P. Hupchick, The Bulgarian-Byzantine Wars for Early Medieval Balkan Hegemony: Silver-Lined Skulls and Blinded Armies, Springer, 2017, .

Footnotes 

11th-century rebellions
Byzantine–Bulgarian Wars
Bulgarian rebellions
Medieval rebellions in Europe
1070s in the Byzantine Empire
11th century in Bulgaria
11th century in Serbia
Conflicts in 1072
Serb rebellions
Byzantine–Serbian battles
1072 in Europe